The Ventura Black Widows, a women's tackle football Tier 3 team, was founded in 2008 by Ahmad Newton of Los Angeles, CA. Originally a member of the National Women’s Football Association (NWFA), they became independent when the league folded later that same year. Shortly after, an up-start league, the WFA, invited the Ventura Black Widows to join.  Due to the Black Widows' small roster, the team decided to play 8-on-8.  After two independent seasons, the Black Widows were invited to join the Women’s Spring Football League in 2010. During their tenure in the WSFL, the VBW won two Southwest Division titles: taking the first one in 2011 and the second in 2013. The next year saw them join the Independent Women's Football League (IWFL) where they continue their active membership.

Plans for the 2015 season include an open and active recruiting effort across multiple Southern California counties, regular weekly practices, home and away games, as well as hosting at least one 6-on-6 holiday tournament in the fall. The team runs an active, up-to-date website (www.blackwidowsfootball.com) to provide recruiting and schedule information to their fans, as well as a YouTube channel for video review. Their Facebook, Twitter and Instagram pages takes a light-hearted look at games and practice highlights, player’s personal stories, and general human-interest features. It is the team’s goal to build and maintain a full roster of 20 players throughout the 2015 season and beyond.  Of particular pride to the VBWs and their owner is the broad diversity among the former and current players. Wide-ranging ages, professions, athletic experience, and backgrounds are represented and celebrated.

As part of their commitment to the Black Widows, each team member on the roster is expected to participate in fundraisers throughout the season. Monies collected help pay for field permits and fees, travel expenses, team and league dues. The sale of team merchandise, popular among local residents, also helps meet these financial requirements. The IWFL mandates that all players furnish their own league-approved uniforms and safety equipment. Players and coaches alike report that being personally invested in the welfare of the team enhances their experience by building camaraderie and fostering strong team bonds.

Season-by-Season

|-
|| 2009 || 2 || 2 || 0 ||

2009

2010

Schedule
The schedule on the team's website says that the Black Widows will play the Las Vegas Showgirlz of the Women's Football Alliance on March 20, the Boise Broncos on May 1 and 29, and the Topeka Mudcats on July 24.  The Ventura Black Widows have played against teams:  NorCal Red Hawks, Boise Broncos, California Lynx, Utah Jynx, Portland Fighting Fillies, Reno Rattlers, Nevada Storm, Salt City Arch Angels, TC (Tulare County) Villainz and River City Raiderz (Hillsboro, OR).

03/28/2009
vs California Lynx 
Fresno, CA @ Selland Arena
Ventura Black Widows w/ Santa Rosa Scorchers

External links 
 
Independent Women's Football League

Independent Women's Football League
Sports in Ventura County, California
American football teams in Los Angeles
American football teams established in 2008
2008 establishments in California
Women's sports in California